Hamirpur is one of the 68 assembly constituencies of  Himachal Pradesh a northern state of India. Hamirpur is also part of Hamirpur, Himachal Pradesh Lok Sabha constituency.

Members of Legislative Assembly

Election candidates

2022

Election results

2017

See also
 List of constituencies of Himachal Pradesh Legislative Assembly
 Hamirpur district, Himachal Pradesh

References

External links
HP official website of the Chief Electoral Officer

External links
 

Assembly constituencies of Himachal Pradesh
Hamirpur, Himachal Pradesh
Hamirpur district, Himachal Pradesh